The MS Ionian Star is a ferry built 1971 by Aalborg Vaerft as Prinsessan Désirée for Swedish Sessanlinjen'''s ferry service between Gothenburg and Frederikshavn. Later she sailed a.o. between Vaberg and Grena as Europafärjan and Europafärjan II. After Stena Line took over this route, she was used by the in-house company Lion Ferry as Lion Princess between Karlskrona and Gdynia. Since 1994 her name was Bohus, operating for Scandi Line between Sandefjord and Strömstad. eingesetzt. 1999 Color Scandi Line was created and since 2000 the ship sailed for Color Line.

2019 the ship was sold to European Ferries. In August she was renamed Ionian Star'' and sailed under Panama flag between Brindisi in Italy and Vlora in Albania.

References

External links
Color Line
Facts about ships - Prinsessan Desiree

Ferries of Norway
Sandefjord
Color Line (ferry operator)
1971 ships
Ships built in Aalborg
Merchant ships of Norway